Eraser Wars is a 2017 Japanese computer-animated science fiction action film. Its director, AKIRA, was in 7th grade at the point of completion and release of the film. All characters are portrayed using rubber erasers. The film was digitally released in Japan, the United States, and the European Union on Amazon Prime in 2018. A sequel and spin-off film, MIDNIGHT ~ Eraser WARS spin off, has also been produced starring actress Hinako Saeki and Kayo Hoshino.

Release 
Busan International Kids & Youth Film Festival (2018)
Animation Runs! (2018)
DONATION THEATER (2018)
Toronto International Independent Film Festival (2017)
21st Bucheon International Fantastic Film Festival (2017)
Cinema New York City official selection (2017)
KINEKO International Children's Film Festival (2017)
Yubari International Fantastic Film Festival (2017)
1st Yokkaichi Film Festival (2017)

References

External links

2017 computer-animated films
2010s Japanese films
2017 films
2017 science fiction action films